This is a list of the National Register of Historic Places listings in Cumberland Island National Seashore.

This is intended to be a complete list of the properties and districts on the National Register of Historic Places in Cumberland Island National Seashore, Georgia, United States.  The locations of National Register properties and districts for which the latitude and longitude coordinates are included below, may be seen in a Google map.

There are eight properties and districts listed on the National Register in the park.

Current listings 

|}

Associated site
Greyfield is a private inholding on Cumberland Island.

|}

See also 
 National Register of Historic Places listings in Camden County, Georgia
 National Register of Historic Places listings in Georgia

References 

Cumberland Island National Seashore